The Williams FW17 is a Formula One racing car designed by Adrian Newey, with which the Williams team competed in the 1995 Formula One World Championship.

Season performance
With what was regarded as the best chassis and aerodynamics in the field combined with the best engine, the 1995 season was disappointing for the team, who were beaten to both titles by Michael Schumacher and Benetton. Although the FW17 was superior in qualifying trim, taking 12 pole positions, Schumacher was usually more competitive on race day. The Benetton team arguably made better strategy decisions during races and Schumacher was able to win nine races against Hill and Coulthard's combined total of five. This situation was not helped by both drivers making several unfortunate errors during the course of the season.

History
For qualifying at the Portuguese Grand Prix, the Williams FW17B was debuted, although not used for the race itself. In the final four races of the season, the FW17B took four pole positions and two victories, but the titles were already just about out of reach due to the success of Schumacher and his Benetton B195.

The team eventually finished second in the Constructors' Championship, with 112 points; both Williams and Benetton had their constructor's points deducted from the Brazilian Grand Prix (6 and 10 points respectively) following an appeal that saw both teams' fuel-related disqualifications overturned from race standings.

The FW17 is notable for being the first Williams car to race with a raised nose, and was the first 'clean sheet' design from the team since 1991 (as the car's two predecessors had been evolutions of the FW14), owing to the new technical regulations for the 1995 season.

During an interview with Top Gear in 2012, Coulthard spoke positively about the FW17, saying that it was his favourite out of the cars he had driven in his career.

Complete Formula One results
(key) (results in bold indicate pole position) 

 – Coulthard's second place at the Brazilian Grand Prix did not count towards Constructors' Championship points as the FIA did not reinstate the constructor's points after the initial disqualification due to fuel irregularities was overturned.

References

External links

Williams Formula One cars
1995 Formula One season cars